Yamaguchi 2nd district (山口県第2区 Yamaguchi-ken dai-ni-ku) is a single-member electoral district for the House of Representatives, the lower house of the National Diet of Japan. It is located in Eastern Yamaguchi and consists of the cities of Kudamatsu, Iwakuni, Hikari, Yanai, and parts of Shūnan.

While Yamaguchi is generally a stronghold for the Liberal Democratic Party, the 2nd district has historically been regarded as a swing seat with closer margins of victory.

Election results

References 

Yamaguchi Prefecture
Districts of the House of Representatives (Japan)